Prillieuxina is a genus of fungi in the Asterinaceae family. The relationship of this taxon to other taxa within the class is unknown (incertae sedis), and it has not yet been placed with certainty into any order.

The genus name of Prillieuxina is in honour of Édouard Ernest Prillieux (1829-1915), who was a French botanist and agronomist known for his work with plant diseases. 

The genus was circumscribed by Gabriel Arnaud in Ann. École Natl. Agric. Montpellier ser.2, vol.16 on pages 161-162 in 
1918.

Species
As accepted by Species Fungorum;

 Prillieuxina amazonica 
 Prillieuxina amboinensis 
 Prillieuxina anamirtae 
 Prillieuxina aquifoliacearum 
 Prillieuxina ardisiae 
 Prillieuxina argyreiae 
 Prillieuxina asterinoides 
 Prillieuxina baccharidincola 
 Prillieuxina calami 
 Prillieuxina calotheca 
 Prillieuxina capizensis 
 Prillieuxina cinchonae 
 Prillieuxina citricola 
 Prillieuxina clavispora 
 Prillieuxina conocephali 
 Prillieuxina creberrima 
 Prillieuxina cylindrotheca 
 Prillieuxina diaphana 
 Prillieuxina dichapetali 
 Prillieuxina diospyri 
 Prillieuxina dipteridis 
 Prillieuxina dipterocarpi 
 Prillieuxina dissiliens 
 Prillieuxina distinguenda 
 Prillieuxina dysoxyli 
 Prillieuxina elaeagni 
 Prillieuxina flexuosa 
 Prillieuxina garciniae 
 Prillieuxina gracilis 
 Prillieuxina hippeastri 
 Prillieuxina hiugensis 
 Prillieuxina humboldtiae 
 Prillieuxina humiriae 
 Prillieuxina hydnocarpi 
 Prillieuxina ilicicola 
 Prillieuxina inconspicua 
 Prillieuxina ixorae 
 Prillieuxina ixoricola 
 Prillieuxina ixorigena 
 Prillieuxina jasmini 
 Prillieuxina lepidotricha 
 Prillieuxina loranthi 
 Prillieuxina luzonensis 
 Prillieuxina mabae 
 Prillieuxina manaosensis 
 Prillieuxina melastomacearum 
 Prillieuxina microchita 
 Prillieuxina multilobata 
 Prillieuxina obesa 
 Prillieuxina pavettae 
 Prillieuxina phoradendri 
 Prillieuxina polyalthiae 
 Prillieuxina pterocelastri 
 Prillieuxina pumila 
 Prillieuxina rhaphiostylidis 
 Prillieuxina saginata 
 Prillieuxina sinensis 
 Prillieuxina tarennae 
 Prillieuxina tetracerae 
 Prillieuxina tjibodensis 
 Prillieuxina venusta 
 Prillieuxina winteriana 

Former species;
 P. acokantherae  = Lembosina acokantherae, Lembosinaceae
 P. antioquensis  = Asterina antioquensis, Asterinaceae
 P. burchelliae  = Asterolibertia burchelliae, Asterinaceae
 P. cryptocaryae  = Asterolibertia cryptocaryae, Asterinaceae
 P. intensa  = Asterinella intensa, Microthyriaceae
 P. malabarensis  = Lembosia malabarensis, Asterinaceae
 P. microspila  = Trichasterina microspila, Asterinaceae
 P. mimusopis  = Asterinella mimusopis, Microthyriaceae
 P. parameriae  = Asterinella parameriae, Microthyriaceae
 P. quinta  = Asterina quarta, Asterinaceae
 P. ramuligera  = Asterina ramuligera, Asterinaceae
 P. santiriae  = Asterolibertia santiriae, Asterinaceae
 P. stuhlmannii  = Asterinella stuhlmannii, Microthyriaceae
 P. systema-solare  = Dothidasteromella systema-solare, Asterinaceae
 P. tecleae  = Asterinella tecleae, Microthyriaceae
 P. woodiana  = Asterina woodiana, Asterinaceae

References

External links
Index Fungorum

Asterinaceae